Elias Ymer was the defending champion but chose not to defend his title.

Paolo Lorenzi won the title after defeating Máté Valkusz 6–3, 3–6, 6–4 in the final.

Seeds

Draw

Finals

Top half

Bottom half

References
Main Draw
Qualifying Draw

Internazionali di Tennis del Friuli Venezia Giulia - Singles
2018 Singles
Friuli